Happy Hearts (French:Coeurs joyeux) is a 1932 French comedy film directed by Hanns Schwarz and Max de Vaucorbeil and starring Josseline Gaël, Gabriel Gabrio and Jean Gabin. A separate German-language version Gypsies of the Night was also released.

Cast
 Josseline Gaël as Lucette  
 Gabriel Gabrio as Olivier  
 Jean Gabin as Charles  
 Lucien Callamand 
 René Bergeron 
 Georges Vitray 
 Marcel Delaître 
 Paul Amiot 
 Henri Vilbert

References

Bibliography 
 Hans-Michael Bock and Tim Bergfelder. The Concise Cinegraph: An Encyclopedia of German Cinema. Berghahn Books.

External links 
 

1932 films
1930s French-language films
Films directed by Hanns Schwarz
Films directed by Max de Vaucorbeil
French multilingual films
French black-and-white films
Films scored by Paul Abraham
French comedy films
1932 comedy films
1932 multilingual films
1930s French films